Wura-Natasha Ogunji (born 1970) is an artist and performer based in Lagos, Nigeria; she is of Nigerian descent.

Education
Ogunji received a BA from Stanford University in 1992 and a MFA from San Jose State University in 1998.

Work and career
Ogunji works in a variety of mediums but is best known for her performative and video-based works. Her artistic themes include physicality and the body, our relationship to space, memory, and history.
Her recent work deals with women occupying the public space of Lagos. 

Ogunji has been a visiting lecturer at the Center for Art of Africa and its Diasporas (CAAD) at the University of Texas at Austin and was awarded the Guggenheim Fellowship in 2012. Her work has been featured in exhibitions at the Seattle Art Museum, Brooklyn Art Museum, Menil Collection, and Louisiana Museum of Modern Art, Humlebaek, among other venues.

References 

Living people
1970 births
American people of Nigerian descent